Rangaeris is a genus of flowering plants from the orchid family, Orchidaceae, naive to sub-Saharan Africa.

Species  
Species accepted as of June 2014:

 Rangaeris amaniensis (Kraenzl.) Summerh., 1949 - Ethiopia, Kenya, Tanzania, Uganda, Zimbabwe 
 Rangaeris longicaudata (Rolfe) Summerh. in J.Hutchinson & J.M.Dalziel, 1936 - Ivory Coast, Nigeria, Cameroon, Gabon 
 Rangaeris muscicola (Rchb.f.) Summerh. in J.Hutchinson & J.M.Dalziel, 1936 - widespread from Liberia to Tanzania to South Africa
 Rangaeris schliebenii (Mansf.) P.J.Cribb, 1989 - Tanzania
 Rangaeris trilobata Summerh., 1936 - Nigeria, Cameroon, Equatorial Guinea, Gabon, São Tomé and Príncipe

See also 
 List of Orchidaceae genera

References

External links 
 
 

Vandeae genera
Orchids of Africa
Angraecinae